Dr Mohammed bin Hamad Al Rumhi is the current Ministry of Energy and Minerals in the Sultanate of Oman and the Chairman of the Board of Directors of Petroleum Development Oman. He has been the Minister of Energy and Minerals from December 16, 1997 till 2022, which is evidence of how highly regarded and respected he is in his role.

References 

Government ministers of Oman
Living people
Year of birth missing (living people)